Émile Lesieur (1885–1985) was a French rugby player.

1885 births
1985 deaths
HEC Paris alumni
French rugby union players
Rugby union centres
Rugby union wings
Stade Français players
France international rugby union players